All-Union Radio was the radio broadcasting organisation for the USSR under Gosteleradio, operated from 1924 until the dissolution of the USSR. The organization was based in Moscow.

History

Beginning
Following the October Revolution control over radio resources was given to the People's Commissariat for Posts and Telegraphs. Then, in 1924 it was transferred to a joint-stock company whose members were the Russian Telegraph Agency, a major electric factory, and the PCPT,10 but in 1928 was returned to the People's Commissariat for Posts and Telegraphs. The first All-Union Radio station, was opened upon Lenin's initiative (for a "paperless newspaper" as the best means of public information) in November 1924. On November 23, 1924 the first regular broadcast was produced in Moscow on the Comintern radio station, using the Shukhov radio tower. In 1925, the Radio Commission of the Central Committee of the RCP(B) was organized for overall supervision of radio broadcasting.

On 30 October 1930, from Tiraspol, MASSR, started broadcasting in the Romanian language a Soviet station of 4 kW whose main purpose was the anti-Romanian propaganda to Bessarabia between Prut and Dniester. In the context in which a new radio mast, M. Gorky, built in 1936 in Tiraspol, allowed a greater coverage of the territory of Moldova, the Romanian state broadcaster started in 1937 to build Radio Basarabia, to counter Soviet propaganda.

When the Cold War started, Americans launched the station Radio Free Europe while Western broadcasts were launched in the Eastern bloc.

Radio jamming

Beginning in 1948, the USSR made use of radio jamming to prevent its citizens from listening to political broadcasts of the British Broadcasting Corporation (BBC) and the Voice of America (VOA) and other western radio programs. Over time this initial effort was escalated dramatically, with the approximately 200 jamming stations with a total between 3 and 4 megawatts of output power in 1952 expanded to about 1,700 transmitters with a combined 45 megawatts of output power. By this latter date, the list of jammed foreign broadcasts had been expanded to include not only the successors to the BBC and VOA, Radio Free Europe and Radio Liberty, but also Deutsche Welle, Radio Vatican, Kol Israel, and others. Total electricity consumed in the course of this jamming operation has been valued at tens of millions of dollars annually, exclusive of site construction and personnel costs.

Jamming was initially attempted by means of superimposed random speech which mimicked station interference. Due to the ineffectiveness of this method, however, a move was later made to the generation of random noise to obscure human speech. From the early 1970s, satellites generating swinging carrier signals were used to interfere even more effectively.

Nevertheless, people continued (or attempted) to listen to Western broadcasts. In fact, there was even no jamming of these signals   (excluding Radio Free Europe) at all, from 1963 to 1968, and from 1973 to 1980. In 1963, a further attempt was made to draw USSR radio listeners from western broadcasts by launching a radio station favouring Moscow city and oblast.

The jamming stopped in 1988 (Radio Free Europe was, however, unblocked in August 1991).

Collapse of the USSR

As the USSR began to fall in the 1980s, the radio organisation of the USSR began to shut down as private services were introduced and the USSR's stations were relaunched and refocused.

Stations

Domestic
 All Union First Programme – the national network of the USSR, focusing on the political and economic life of the Soviet Union. 
 Radio Mayak – music and speech based entertainment
 Radio Yunost – the station for young people
 Radio Orfey – culture, education, classical music

International
 Radio Moscow – the foreign-language service

See also
Eastern Bloc information dissemination
Radio jamming
Censorship in the Soviet Union
Propaganda in the Soviet Union
Radio Yerevan jokes
 Media of the Soviet Union

Footnotes

External links

Russian Museum of Radio and TV website 
Soviet Union
 
Soviet All-Union Radio Committee Collection (ARS.0085), Stanford Archive of Recorded Sound

 
Eastern Bloc mass media